"When the Money's Gone" is a song was written by Bruce Roberts and Donna Weiss and first released by Bruce Roberts on his 1995 album Intimacy. English musician Elton John provided backing vocals. An uptempo dance remix featuring Kristine W was also issued. The track peaked at number thirty-two on Billboard's Hot Dance Club Play chart.

In 2003 the song was released as the last North American single by American singer-actress Cher from her twenty-fifth studio album, Living Proof. It was released in 2003 by Warner Bros, and WEA.

Charts

Cher version

In 2001, Cher released a cover of the song on her album, Living Proof. In 2003, "When the Money's Gone" with the song "Love One Another" as its B-side was released as Cher's third and final American single. "Love One Another" earned Cher a Grammy nomination for Best Dance Recording; however, she lost the award to Kylie Minogue's song, "Come into My World". Cher performed "Love One Another" on The Farewell Tour and was sung as part of the Love Medley on the fifth leg of the tour only in Europe.

Track listing
US CD Maxi Single (42496-2)

 "When The Money's Gone" (Brother Brown H&H Vocal Mix) - 8.06
 "When The Money's Gone" (The Passengerz Club Mix) - 7.29
 "When The Money's Gone" (Thick Dick Vs. Cher Bootleg Mix) - 8.09
 "When The Money's Gone" (Manny Lehman Vocal) - 9.26
 "When The Money's Gone" (Brother Brown Dynamo Mix) - 7.37
 "Love One Another" (Eddie Baez Club Mix) - 8.49
 "Love One Another" (J Start Club Mix) - 8..05
 "Love One Another" (Friscia & Lamboy Club Mix) - 9.43

Critical reception 
Allmusic editor Kerry L. Smith wrote that fans and club kids would appreciate the "rapid-fire drum beats on th[is] airy track". Slant Magazine called this song one of the worst moments on the album but still praised it for "maintain[ing] the high-energy, club-ready pace [of the album]".

Charts

Weekly charts

Year-end charts

See also
 List of Billboard Hot Dance Music/Club Play number ones of 2003

References

External links
 Official Cher site
 Warner official site
 

1995 songs
1995 singles
Cher songs
2003 singles
Songs written by Bruce Roberts (singer)
Bruce Roberts (singer) songs
Warner Records singles
Songs written by Donna Weiss
Articles containing video clips